Pepper Island also called Leppe Island or Island Number Ten is an island on the Mohawk River south of Fort Johnson in Montgomery County, New York.

References

Islands of New York (state)
Mohawk River
River islands of New York (state)